John Richardson (11 November 1906 – 2 January 1986) was a Scottish professional footballer who played for Hamilton Academical, Northfleet United, Tottenham Hotspur, Reading, Bournemouth & Boscombe Athletic and Folkestone.

Football career 
Richardson began his senior career as a teenager at Hamilton Academical. He joined Northfleet United (the "nursery" club of Tottenham Hotspur) in 1924 before signing officially for Tottenham in 1927. The full back made a total of 41 appearances in all competitions for the Spurs between 1927–29. Richardson joined Reading in 1929 where he featured in 133 matches in total. He later played for Bournemouth & Boscombe Athletic and finally ending his career at Folkestone. He later worked as a scout for Tottenham based in Scotland.

References

1906 births
1986 deaths
Footballers from Motherwell
Scottish footballers
English Football League players
Scottish Football League players
Scottish Junior Football Association players
Hamilton Academical F.C. players
Northfleet United F.C. players
Tottenham Hotspur F.C. players
Tottenham Hotspur F.C. non-playing staff
Association football scouts
Reading F.C. players
AFC Bournemouth players
Folkestone F.C. players
Association football defenders